Goričice is a small village northeast of Gorenje Jezero on the shore of Lake Cerknica in the Municipality of Cerknica in the Inner Carniola region of Slovenia.

History
Goričice was a hamlet of neighboring Lipsenj until 1989, when it was separated and became an independent settlement.

Gallery

References

External links 

Goričice on Geopedia

Populated places in the Municipality of Cerknica